Somerset County Technology Center (SCTC) is a public vocational-technical school just outside Somerset, Pennsylvania. SCTC has eight sending high schools, in which students attend the center for one-half of the day and their home school for the other one half. It also offers adult education opportunities, both on- and off-site, to county residents.

High School Opportunities
Presently, SCTC has eight sending school districts, which sends Sophomores, Juniors and Seniors from their respective High Schools to the center for one-half day to participate in career workshops. Cooperative Education is also available

Sending School Districts/High Schools

High School Programs
There are fifteen  career programs for the High School Students, including:
 Auto Body Technology
 Auto Technology
 Carpentry
 Computer Networking
 Cosmetology
 Culinary Arts
 Dental Assisting
 Early Childhood Education
 Electrical Occupations
 Forestry
 Health Occupations
 Machine Technology
 Masonry
 Pre-Engineering Drafting & Design
 Welding

High school clubs and organizations
Students may belong to the following clubs or organizations while attending SCCTC
 SkillsUSA
 FFA
 National Association of Home Builders - Student Chapter
 SADD
 BotsIQ of Southwestern Pennsylvania

Adult Education
Adult education opportunities abound at SCTC, which include: Distance Learning, Intergenerational Learning, Short-Term Programs and Adult Literacy

Customized Training
SCTC offers agencies and businesses in the community work-related training  to maintain a trained workforce, either on or off site.

References

Educational institutions established in 1972
Schools in Somerset County, Pennsylvania
Public high schools in Pennsylvania
1972 establishments in Pennsylvania